Back from Earth is the debut EP by American rock band Awolnation. It was released digitally by Red Bull Records on May 18, 2010 for iTunes. "Sail", "Burn It Down" and "Guilty Filthy Soul" appear on Megalithic Symphony, the band's debut album. The EP also features a dubstep remix for "Burn It Down" by Innerpartysystem, which appears on the deluxe version of the album along with "MF".

Track listing

References

2010 debut EPs
Awolnation albums
Red Bull Records EPs